Bedessa or Bedesa may refer to:

 Bedessa (Wolaita), a town in the SNNPR Region of Ethiopia
 Badessa, Oromia, a town in the Oromia Region of Ethiopia
 Bedesa, an exonym for the Biate people of India

See also
 Badessa (disambiguation)
 Belessa, a former district of the Amhara Region of Ethiopia